Kentucky Route 205 (KY 205) is a  state highway in the U.S. state of Kentucky. The highway connects mostly rural areas of Breathitt, Wolfe, and Morgan counties with Jackson, Vancleve, and Helechawa.

Route description

Breathitt County
KY 205 begins at an intersection with KY 30 in Jackson, within Breathitt County. The highway parallels the North Fork Kentucky River. It travels to the north-northwest, leaves Jackson, crosses over Shacks Branch, and intersects the southern terminus of KY 3193. It curves to the east-northeast, leaving the river. Then, it curves to the northeast and intersects KY 15. The two highway travel concurrently to the northwest, rejoining the river along the way. When they split, KY 205 travels to the southwest and curves to the west-northwest and travels through Fivemile. The highway curves to the north and intersects the northern terminus of KY 3193. It crosses over Frozen Boone Fork immediately before an intersection with the northern terminus of KY 541 (Mt. Carmel Road). KY 205 heads to the northeast, paralleling the fork, and has an interchange with KY 15/KY 1812. Here, KY 205 and KY 1812 begin a concurrency. They cross over Little Frozen Creek, travel through Wilhurst, and cross Boone Fork before they split. KY 205 heads to the northeast and crosses over the fork. It then crosses over the fork two more times and travels through Simpson. The highway curve to the northeast and enters Wolfe County.

Wolfe County
KY 205 begins by paralleling Rose Fork. It then crosses over the fork six times and Red River before it enters Lee City. There, it intersects the northern terminus of KY 1094. KY 205 parallels the river out of Lee City. It curves to the northeast and enters Helechawa, where it crosses State Road Fork, has an interchange with the Bert T. Combs Mountain Parkway, and begins a concurrency with KY 191. The two highways head to the northwest and curve to the north-northwest, where they split. KY 205 heads to the east-northeast and enters Morgan County.

Morgan County
KY 205 enters Sellars, where it crosses over Sellars Fork and curves to the north-northwest. The highway begins paralleling the fork and again crosses it. KY 205 intersects the western terminus of KY 844 (Salem Church Road). It curves to the east-northeast and crosses the fork again. Right after it crosses over Payton Fork, it intersects KY 705 (Walters Branch Road/Grassy Creek Road). It heads to the northeast and curves to the north-northeast and meets its northern terminus, an intersection with U.S. Route 460 (US 460).

Major intersections

See also

References

0205
Transportation in Breathitt County, Kentucky
Transportation in Wolfe County, Kentucky
Transportation in Morgan County, Kentucky